Sabahya is a genus of Indonesian araneomorph spiders in the family Pacullidae that was first described by Christa Laetitia Deeleman-Reinhold in 1980.  it contains two species, found on Borneo: S. bispinosa and S. kinabaluana. Originally placed with the Tetrablemmidae, it was moved to the Pacullidae after a 2017 genetic study.

See also
 List of Pacullidae species

References

Araneomorphae genera
Pacullidae
Spiders of Asia